The 2012–13 Rwanda National Football League (known as the Primus National Football League for sponsorship reasons) was the 36th season of the Rwanda National Football League since it began in 1975. The season began on 22 September 2012 and ended on 25 May 2013. Armée Patriotique Rwandaise were the defending champions, having won their record 13th title the previous season.

Rayon Sports won their 7th title, finishing at the top of the table with 57 points, and represented Rwanda in the 2014 CAF Champions League.

Clubs

Changes from last season
The number of teams in the league increased from 13 last season to 14 this season after Nyanza's withdrawal and their replacement by Espoir in the league.

Relegated from National Football League
 Nyanza

Promoted from Second Division
 Muhanga
 Musanze

Participating teams

League table

Results

References

Rwanda
Rwanda National Football League seasons
football
football